Desperate is the official debut studio album of Daphne Khoo. It was released in December, 2007. It contains the singles "Doll" and "Desperate". It is well received in Southeast Asia, Singapore.

Track listing
 "Doll"
 "Desperate"
 "Wrong"
 "J-tusk"
 "Tribute"
 "Little Love Song"
 "Charlene"
 "Rescue"
 "That Song"
 "Letting Go"
 "Bleeding Tears"
 "Doll (radio edit)"

References

External links
 

2007 albums
Daphne Khoo albums